The Cambodian rebellion of 1840 was a Cambodian short-lived anti-Vietnamese insurrection fought particularly heavily around Prey Veng and Ba Phnom. 

In 1840, the Cambodian queen Ang Mey was deposed by Vietnamese; she was arrested and deported to Vietnam along with her relatives and the royal regalia. Spurred by the incident, many Cambodian courtiers and their followers revolted against the Vietnamese rule. The rebels appealed to Siam who supported another claimant to the Cambodian throne, Prince Ang Duong. Rama III responded and sent Ang Duong back from exile in Bangkok with Siamese troops to install him on the throne. 

The Vietnamese suffered attack from both Siamese troops and Cambodian rebels. What was worse, in Cochinchina, there were several rebellion broke out. The main strength of Vietnamese marched to Cochinchina to put down those rebellions. Thiệu Trị, the new crowned Vietnamese emperor, decided to seek a peaceful resolution. Trương Minh Giảng, the Governor-General of Trấn Tây (Cambodia), was called back. Giảng was arrested and later committed suicide in prison.

Ang Duong agreed to place Cambodia under joint Siamese-Vietnamese protection in 1846. The Vietnamese released Cambodian royalties and returned the royal regalia. In the same time, Vietnamese troops pulled out of Cambodia. Finally, Vietnamese lost control of this country, Cambodia won independence from Vietnam. Though there were still a few Siamese troops stayed in Cambodia, the Cambodian king had greater autonomy than before.

Notes
Footnote

Citations

References

See also 
Cambodian rebellion (1811–12)
Cambodian rebellion (1820)
Vietnamese invasions of Cambodia
Siamese–Vietnamese War (1841–1845)

 

19th century in Cambodia
19th century in Vietnam
Rebellions in the Nguyễn dynasty
Cambodia–Vietnam relations
Wars involving Vietnam
Wars involving Cambodia
Wars involving Thailand
Rebellions in Asia
Conflicts in 1840
19th-century rebellions
National liberation movements
Anti-Vietnamese sentiment
1840 in Asia